Sheikh Fazlul Karim (1882–1936), also known by his daak naam Mona, was a Bengali poet and writer. He was born in Lalmonirhat.

Early life and education 
Sheikh Fazlul Karim was born on 30 Choitro 1289 BS (1882) to the Bengali Muslim Sheikh family of the village of Kakina Bazar which was then located in Lalmonirhat, Rangpur district, Bengal Presidency, the family had been honored with the title of "Sardar." He was the second of the five sons and three daughters of Sheikh Amirullah Sardar and Kokila Bibi. They were an affluent family in the village.

Fazlul Karim was interested in poetry from a young age, and it has been said that there were times when he would escape to go to school whilst only three to four years of age. When he turned five, he joined the Kakina School. At the age of eleven, he published his first handwritten book of poetry, Shorol Poddo Bikash. He then went on to enrol at the Rangpur Zilla School for class six but returned to Kakina School instead where he completed his minor. He was then sent to Rangpur again, but returned home once again.

Personal life
Sheikh Fazlul Karim married Basirunnesa Khatun when he was 13 years old.

Career 
Karim wrote his first book at the age of eleven, entitled Sarol Paddo Bikash. From this point on, the remainder of his life was devoted to literature. He was famous for both his prose and poetry. He edited the monthly BASANA.

Karim's writing is marked by a profound simplicity. He worked for Hindu-Muslim friendship. His literary works have been included in school curriculum, in both secondary and higher secondary Bengali Literature in Bangladesh.

Works
 Sarol Paddo Bikash
 Poritran Kabbo
 Chintar Chash
 Path  o Patheyo
 Gatha
 Voktipushpanjoli

References 

 Helal M. Abu Taher: Muslim Sahitya Prativa published by Islamic Foundation, Dhaka, 1980.

1882 births
1936 deaths
19th-century Bengali poets
Bengali-language poets
Bengali male poets
20th-century Bengali poets
19th-century Indian male writers
20th-century Indian male writers
People from Lalmonirhat District
Bengali Muslims